Thomas Price (1840–1906) was a politician in Queensland, Australia. He was a Member of the Queensland Legislative Assembly. Price was the member for the Electoral District of Wide Bay from November 1878 to September 1883.

Personal life 
He was born in 1840 in Ilfracombe, Devonshire, England to Thomas Price and Elizabeth (née Banter). He died on 4 April 1906 in Albion, Brisbane, Queensland. He married Elizabeth Grice (died 1933) on 27 December 1870, and had 4 sons and 3 daughters.

Price was a builder and contractor who acquired a Tiaro grazing property in 1890.

According to an article in the Melbourne Age he was fined 40 shillings for drunkenness and disturbing the services of the salvation army.

References

Members of the Queensland Legislative Assembly
1840 births
1906 deaths
19th-century Australian politicians